Omar Majeed is a Pakistani Canadian film director and producer who studied cinema at York University Film School and later on studied editing at the International Academy of Design in Toronto. He is the son of Pakistani actress and singer Musarrat Nazir. He went on to work as producer Toronto's Citytv and won a Gemini Award for his television work. He also worked with Canada's National Film Board through the Reel Diversity program in Montreal and with EyeSteelFilm.

He is known for his 2009 documentary film Taqwacore (full title Taqwacore: The Birth of Punk Islam) produced by EyeSteelFilm about a number of Taqwacore bands and performers touring the United States and Pakistan. Majeed filmed the documentary during the three years 2007 to 2009 and released it on 16 October 2009.

Before Taqwacore, he worked at CityTV as an editor on the shows QT: QueerTelevision and SexTV and as a producer at Book Television.

Majeed's 2009 documentary Taqwacore is a look at the Muslim punk movement that sprung Michael Muhammad Knight's book The Taqwacores and features members of The Kominas, Diacritical, Secret Trial Five, and Al-Thawra. It has been shown at several international festivals, including the Vancouver International Film Festival, Montreal's Festival du nouveau cinéma, the International Documentary Festival of Amsterdam (IDFA), the Gothenburg Film Festival and the Available Light Film Festival in Whitehorse. It has played theatrically in Canada and will open across the United States in 2010. The film had its U.S. premiere at Austin's South by Southwest Film Festival in March 2010.

He also co-directed The Frog Princes with Ryan Mullins about a young theatre troupe training for a play, under extraordinary circumstances as all twenty members of the cast have intellectual and developmental disabilities. The film was also shown nationally on Canadian Broadcasting Corporation (CBC) on 6 August 2011.

Filmography

Director
2003: "The Boy Code... Forming Masculinity / The Descent of Men" (8 Nov. 2003 episode / SexTV)
2005: Stare with Your Ears: Ken Nordine (for BookTelevision)
2008: Exquisite corpse (video short)
2009: Taqwacore: The Birth of Punk Islam
2010: The Frog Princes (co-directed with Ryan Mullins)

Editor
2000-2001: QT: QueerTelevision
2001-2005: SexTV
2002: "Trembling Before G-d / Midori" (6 July 2002) (Editor, post-production)  
2002: "Big, Bold & Busty / David Sterry / Jane's Guide" (Additional editor)  
2003: "The Cockettes / Aural Sex: The Art of Erotic Talk" (Additional editor)  
2003: SexTV Roundtable: "Shooting Porn" (Editor)  
2003: "Connecting... Sex, Love and Romance in Cyberspace" (Editor, post-production)  
2003: "Hugh Hefner / Sex and Elderly Homes / Porn Orchestra" (Editor)  
2003: "Synthetic Desires: Living with Dolls" (Editor)  
2003: "Fairy Tales / Karin Rosenthal / Tart Cards" (Editor)  
2003: "The Boy Code... Forming Masculinity / The Descent of Men" (Editor, director)  
2004: "Pride and Joy" (Editor)  
2004: "Heera Mandi / Sex Advice to All Creation / A Moment with... Al Link and Pala Copeland (Editor, additional segment producer, additional footage)  
2005: "The Andropause Debate / Elinor Carucci / Ian Kerner" (Additional footage)  
2008: P.O.V." (1 episode) entitled Up the Yangtze (as post-production coordinator)
2011: Inside Lara Roxx

Producer
2003-2005: BookTelevision
2004: SexTV
Heera Mandi / Sex Advice to All Creation / A Moment with... Al Link / Pala Copeland (editor)

Festivals
Omar Majeed's Taqwacore has been shown in many festivals including:
Vancouver International Film Festival (world premiere)
Montreal's Festival du Nouveau Cinéma—Temps Zero stream
Sheffield Doc/Fest

Awards
Gemini Award for television work

References

External links

Omar Majeed materials in the South Asian American Digital Archive (SAADA)

EyeSteelFilm
Canadian television editors
Canadian television producers
Canadian people of Pakistani descent
Living people
Canadian documentary film directors
Asian-Canadian filmmakers
Year of birth missing (living people)